Eileen Robin Filler-Corn (born June 5, 1964) is an American lawyer and politician who served as the Minority Leader of the Virginia House of Delegates from January to April 2022, a position she previously held from 2019 to 2020. She previously served as the 56th Speaker of the Virginia House of Delegates from 2020 to 2022. Since 2010 she has served in the Virginia House of Delegates, representing the 41st district in the Fairfax County suburbs of Washington, D.C. She is a member of the Democratic Party. She is also the first woman and Jew to serve as Speaker of the Virginia House of Delegates.

Personal life
Filler-Corn was born in New York City and grew up in West Windsor, New Jersey, graduating from West Windsor-Plainsboro High School in 1982. She graduated from Ithaca College, Ithaca NY with a B.A. degree in 1986. She received her J.D. degree from American University Washington College of Law in Washington, DC in 1993. In the time between her two college stints, she worked on Democrat Jeff Laurenti's unsuccessful 1986 campaign to defeat incumbent Republican congressman Chris Smith. She and her husband Robert Corn, President of Landmark Strategies, Inc., a national issue advocacy, grassroots engagement and campaign voter contact firm, have two children.

Career

Filler-Corn served as director of intergovernmental affairs in the administrations of Virginia governors Mark Warner and Tim Kaine. Since 2007 she has been director of government relations at Albers & Company, a national lobbying and consulting firm in Arlington.

On January 1, 2019, Filler-Corn became Leader of the House Democratic Caucus, and was the first woman to lead a caucus in the 400-year history of the Virginia House of Delegates.

From 2020 to 2022, Filler-Corn served as the Chair of the Rules Committee and as Chair of the Joint Rules Subcommittee.

Filler-Corn first ran for the 41st district seat in 1999, but was unsuccessful. She won the seat in a 2010 special election to replace David W. Marsden, who had himself won a special election to the Senate of Virginia the month before. Jim Dillard, the Republican incumbent who defeated Filler-Corn in 1999, endorsed her candidacy in 2010 because of her opponent's remarks that funding for Fairfax County Public Schools was "excessive".

Filler-Corn won by 37 votes. She was sworn in on March 3, 2010, after her opponent dropped his plans to request a recount.

In 2019, Filler-Corn introduced and passed House bills on a variety of issues, from expanding education on the topic of consent in schools to exempting disabled veterans from motor vehicle property tax.

On January 8, 2020, the new Democratic majority elected Filler-Corn Speaker of the Virginia House of Delegates. She is both the first woman and Jewish person to serve in this position. On November 9, 2019, following elections where the Democratic Party of Virginia won control of the House, the incoming caucus officially nominated her for the position of Speaker in the 161st General Assembly. She began her term as Speaker on January 8, 2020.

On May 26, 2020, Filler-Corn endorsed Joe Biden for President.

On April 27, 2022, Filler-Corn was removed from her position as Democratic leader after a vote of the party caucus; no official reason was given. The caucus did not have an immediate vote to fill the position, but it is now held by Don Scott.

In March 2023, Filler-Corn announced she would not run for reelection this year.

Legislative issues
In 2019, one of Filler-Corn's top priorities has been preventing gun violence. She and other Democrats formed a “Safe Virginia Initiative” task force, which she co-chairs, to examine the issue.

In response to the refusal by Republican delegates to consider gun control legislation, she has stated that action on gun control must be taken in order to prioritize school safety.

The Virginia Education Association Fund for Children and Public Education has endorsed her because she has consistently voted for legislation supporting public education.

Electoral history

References

External links
 (campaign finance)

|-

|-

1964 births
21st-century American Jews
21st-century American politicians
21st-century American women politicians
Ithaca College alumni
Jewish American state legislators in Virginia
Jewish women politicians
Living people
People from Springfield, Virginia
Politicians from New York City
People from West Windsor, New Jersey
Speakers of the Virginia House of Delegates
Democratic Party members of the Virginia House of Delegates
Virginia lawyers
Washington College of Law alumni
West Windsor-Plainsboro High School South alumni
Women state legislators in Virginia